"The stwuns that built George Ridler's oven" is a ballad from Gloucestershire that has a double meaning known originally only to the members of The Gloucestershire Society where George Ridler is King Charles I and the oven represents the Cavalier interest.

References 

English ballads
Music in Gloucestershire